The following is a list of 2017 box office number-one films in China (only Mainland China).

See also
List of Chinese films of 2017

References

2017
China
2017 in Chinese cinema